Headingley Cricket Ground is a sports ground in Headingley, Leeds, England, which has hosted international cricket matches, along with many domestic games. It is the home of the Yorkshire County Cricket Club. It has hosted international cricket matches since 1899, the first Test at the ground took place in between Australia and England in late June of that year. and has been home to more than 90 Test matches in total. Headingley has also staged 40 One Day International (ODI) matches, the first of which was in 1973 when the hosts England defeated West Indies by 1 wicket.

In cricket, a five-wicket haul (also known as a "five-for" or "fifer") refers to a bowler taking five or more wickets in a single innings. This is regarded as a notable achievement. 

The first bowler to take a five-wicket haul in a Test match at Headingley was Hugh Trumble in 1899;  he finished with bowling figures of five wickets for 60 runs (5/60) in England's first innings. The best figures in Test cricket at Headingley are the 8/43, taken by England's Bob Willis against Australia in July 1981.

Key

Test match five-wicket hauls

There have been 109 five-wicket hauls taken in Test matches on the ground.

Men's matches

Women's matches

One Day International five-wicket hauls

There have been seven five-wicket hauls taken in ODIs on the ground.

Notes

References

External links
International five-wicket hauls at Headingley, CricInfo

Headingley
English cricket lists
Headingley Stadium